This is a summary of the year 2011 in the Canadian music industry.

Events

February
 February 11 – Indie rock band Immaculate Machine formally announce their breakup.

March
 March 27 – The 2011 Juno Awards, the 40th annual ceremony.

June
 June 16 – Preliminary 2011 Polaris Music Prize longlist is announced.

July
 ChartAttack, a music website published by the longtime former Canadian music magazine Chart, suspends publication.

August
 August 1 – Saskatoon band The Sheepdogs are announced as the winners of Rolling Stone'''s "Do You Wanna Be a Rock & Roll Star" competition for unsigned rock bands.

September
 September 19 – Arcade Fire are announced as the winners of the 2011 Polaris Music Prize for their album The Suburbs.

November
 November 1 – Canadian entertainment news website andPOP acquires ChartAttack, announcing plans to revive it with expanded video content.

Bands reformed
Death from Above 1979

Bands on hiatus
Secret and Whisper
Wolf Parade
You Say Party

Bands disbanded
Alexisonfire
Immaculate Machine
Mobile
Quo Vadis
The Stills

Albums released

A
Adam and the Amethysts, Flickering FlashlightArkells, Michigan Left – October 18
Jann Arden, Uncover Me 2Armistice, Armistice – February 15
Austra, Feel It BreakB
Jason Bajada, The Sound Your Life MakesJill Barber, Mischievous Moon – April 5
Matthew Barber, Matthew BarberThe Barr Brothers, The Barr BrothersBernice, What Was ThatThe Besnard Lakes, You Lived in the CityBlackie and the Rodeo Kings, Kings and QueensBraids, Native Speaker – January 18
Les Breastfeeders, Dans la gueule des joursMichael Bublé, ChristmasBruce Peninsula, Open FlamesBuck 65, 20 Odd Years – February 1
The Burning Hell, Flux CapacitorLouise Burns, Mellow DramaC
Kathryn Calder, Bright and Vivid – October 25
Jennifer Castle, CastlemusicCannon Bros., Firecracker/CloudglowLou Canon, Lou Canon – May 10
George Canyon, Better Be Home SoonKeshia Chanté, Night & Day – November 8
City and Colour, Little Hell – June 7
Code Pie, Love Meets RageCœur de pirate, Blonde – November 8
Antoine Corriveau, Saint-Maurice/LoganCowboy Junkies, Demons – February 15
Jim Cuddy, Skyscraper Soul – September 27
Cuff the Duke, Morning Comes – October 4
Isabelle Cyr and Yves Marchand, Pays d'abondanceD
The Dardanelles, The Eastern LightDavid Suzuki Foundation, Playlist for the Planet – March 22
Mark Davis, Eliminate the ToxinsThe Dears, Degeneration Street – February 15
The Deep Dark Woods, The Place I Left Behind – August 2
Destroyer, Kaputt – January 25
Dinosaur Bones, My DividerDog Day, DeformerDrake, Take Care – November 15
D-Sisive, Jonestown 2: Jimmy Go Bye ByeDuchess Says, In a Fung Day T!E
Fred Eaglesmith, 6 VoltsElliott Brood, Days Into Years – September 27
Emerson Drive, Decade of Drive – February 8
Matt Epp and the Amorian Assembly, At Dawn – April 12

F
Feist, Metals – October 4
Christine Fellows, Femmes de chez nous – February 1

G
Galaxie, Tigre et diéselGatineau, Karaoke kingThe Golden Seals, Increase the SweetnessJenn Grant, Honeymoon Punch – January 7
Great Aunt Ida, Nuclearize MeGrey Kingdom, Eulogy of Her and Her and HerEmm Gryner, Northern GospelH
Handsome Furs, Sound Kapital – June 28
Ron Hawkins, Straitjacket LoveHey Rosetta!, Seeds – February 15
Rebekah Higgs, Odd FellowshipHooded Fang, Tosta MistaI
Imaginary Cities, Temporary ResidentJ
Jorane, Une Sorcière comme les autresJunior Boys, It's All TrueK
Kellarissa, Moon of Neptune – March 29
Koriass, Petites victoiresK-os, Muchmusic Presents: K-os Live – October 4

L
Avril Lavigne, Goodbye Lullaby – March 8
Salomé Leclerc, Sous les arbresLibrary Voices, Summer of LustLights, Siberia – October 4
Little Scream, The Golden Record – March 15
 Rob Lutes and Rob MacDonald, LiveThe Luyas, Too Beautiful to Work – February 22

M
Catherine MacLellan, SilhouetteMadison Violet, The Good in GoodbyeThe Mahones, The Black IrishCatherine Major, Le désert des solitudesKate Maki, Moonshine – May 24
Kate Maki and Frederick Squire, Calling It Quits/Crazy Tropical Survival Guide – March 22
Malajube, La Caverne – April 19
Dan Mangan, Oh Fortune – September 27
Memphis, Here Comes a City - March 8
Patrice Michaud, Le Triangle des BermudesMillimetrik, Around You; InfluencesMiracle Fortress, Was I the Wave?Monogrenade, TantaleKatie Moore, Montebello – February 1
The Most Serene Republic, Pre Serene: Thee OneironautsMother Mother, Eureka – March 15
Krista Muir, Between AtomsN
New Country Rehab, New Country Rehab – January 11<ref name=ncrehab>"New Country Rehab not your grandaddy’s bluegrass". Guelph Mercury, January 12, 2011.</ref>
Nickelback, Here and Now

O
Oh Susanna, Soon the Birds – April 19
Ohbijou, Metal Meets – September 27
One Hundred Dollars, Songs of Man
Lindi Ortega, Little Red Boots
Karim Ouellet, Plume

P
The Pack A.D., Unpersons
Papermaps, Papermaps
Joel Plaskett, EMERGENCYs, false alarms, shipwrecks, castaways, fragile creatures, special features, demons and demonstrations

R
Lee Reed, Emergency Broadcast
Amanda Rheaume, Light of Another Day
Robbie Robertson, How to Become Clairvoyant – April 5
JF Robitaille, Calendar
Daniel Romano, Sleep Beneath the Willow – April 5
The Rural Alberta Advantage, Departing – March 1

S
Sam Roberts Band, Collider – May 10
Sarahmée, Retox
SATE, (S)cream
Ron Sexsmith, Long Player Late Bloomer – March 1
Shotgun Jimmie, Transistor Sister
Simple Plan, Get Your Heart On! – June 17
Sloan, The Double Cross
Snailhouse, Sentimental Gentleman – May 24
Socalled, Sleepover – May 3
Samantha Savage Smith, Tough Cookie
Spring Breakup, It's Not You, it's Me
Frederick Squire, Frederick Squire Sings Shenandoah and Other Popular Hits – May 24
Stars, The Bedroom Demos
Colin Stetson, New History Warfare Vol. 2: Judges
Jeffery Straker, under the soles of my shoes 
Sum 41, Screaming Bloody Murder – March 29
Sunparlour Players, Us Little Devils – October 18
Sweatshop Union, The Bill Murray EP – March 1

T
Tasseomancy, Ulalume – August 30
Theory of a Deadman, The Truth Is... - July 12
Thus Owls, Harbours 
Timber Timbre, Creep on Creepin' On – April 5
 Tire le coyote, Le Fleuve en huile
The Trews, Hope & Ruin – April 12
Al Tuck, Under Your Shadow
Kreesha Turner, Tropic Electric – November 15

V
Chad VanGaalen, Diaper Island – May 17
Various Artists, Have Not Been the Same – Vol. 1: Too Cool to Live, Too Smart to Die – November 15

W
The Wailin' Jennys, Bright Morning Stars
Bry Webb, Provider – November 15
Whitehorse (Luke Doucet and Melissa McClelland), Whitehorse – August 30
Graham Wright, Shirts vs. Skins

Y
Ken Yates, The Backseat EP
Young Galaxy, Shapeshifting – February 8

Top hits on record

Top 10 American albums

Top 10 British albums

Top 10 International albums

Top 10 Singles

Canadian Hot 100 Year-End List

Deaths
 January 18 – Antonín Kubálek, classical pianist
 February 11 – Bad News Brown, 33, rapper and harmonica player
 March 22 – Victor Bouchard, pianist and composer
 April 6 – John Bottomley, singer-songwriter
 May 13 – Jack Richardson, record producer
 May 28 – Alys Robi, jazz singer
 June 9 – Claude Léveillée, 78, composer and chansonnier
 June 23 – Gaye Delorme, guitarist
 July 10 – Pierrette Alarie, opera singer
 August 7 – Jiří Traxler, jazz pianist
 December 22 – David Gold, heavy metal singer (Woods of Ypres)

See also 
 2010s in music
 2011 in Canadian television

References